Fabbriche di Vallico was a comune (municipality) in the Province of Lucca in the Italian region Tuscany, located about  northwest of Florence and about  northwest of Lucca. On 1 January 2014 it was merged with Vergemoli in the new comune of Fabbriche di Vergemoli.

The main village of the comune, Fabbriche, was founded by ironworkers from Bergamo in the 14th century. The lesser villages of Vallico di Sopra and Vallico di Sotto are centuries older with surviving records going back to the eighth century. Originally called Vallivo or Vallibo, Vallico di Sopra (Upper Vallico) was the primary settlement but Vallico di Sotto (Lower Vallico) appeared in the 11th century.

By the 19th century Fabbriche had attracted families from Vallico and from neighbouring parts of the Versilia mountains, the Middle Serchio valley and the Modenese Apennines. The population has steadily decreased since the late 19th century and is only about one quarter of what it was at that time.
 

Cities and towns in Tuscany
Fabbriche di Vergemoli
Frazioni of the Province of Lucca